{{Speciesbox
| image = Flora Atlantica, sive, Historia plantarum quae in Atlante, agro Tunetano et Algeriensi crescunt (Plate 14) (7455934456).jpg
| image_caption = 
| genus = Eragrostis
| species = atrovirens
| authority = (Desf.) Trin. ex Steud. 1840
| synonyms_ref = 
| synonyms = 
 Briza elegans Osbeck
 Eragrostis atrovirens var. hesperidum Maire
 Eragrostis atroviridis Maire
 Eragrostis biformis (Kunth) Benth.
 Eragrostis bromoides Jedwabn.
 Eragrostis luzoniensis Steud.
 Eragrostis multiflora var. biformis (Kunth) A.Chev.
 Eragrostis multinodis B.S.Sun & S.Wang
 Eragrostis sudanica A.Chev.
 Poa atrovirens Desf.
 Poa biformis Kunth
}}Eragrostis atrovirens''''' is a species of grass. It is found in the tropical and subtropical parts of the world.

See also 
 List of Eragrostis species

References

External links 

 Eragrostis atrovirens at The Plant List
 Eragrostis atrovirens at Tropicos

atrovirens
Plants described in 1840